Gary Dale Farmer (born June 12, 1953) is a Canadian actor and musician. He is perhaps best known for his role as Nobody in the films Dead Man (1995) and Ghost Dog: The Way of the Samurai (1999), and for his role in Smoke Signals (1998). In his career spanning over three decades, Farmer received three Independent Spirit Award for Best Supporting Male nominations.

He is widely recognized as a pioneer in the development of First Nations media in Canada and is the founding director of an urban Indian radio network, Aboriginal Voices Radio Network.

Early life and education
Farmer was born in Ohsweken, Ontario into the Cayuga Nation and Wolf Clan of the Haudenosaunee/Iroquois Confederacy. He grew up in the American city of Buffalo where his father worked as a crane operator. Farmer attended Syracuse University and Ryerson Polytechnic University, where he studied photography and film production.

Career 
Farmer's first acting role was in the 1976 play On The Rim of a Curse, about the Beothuk. His first major television role was on the CBC's Spirit Bay. He subsequently played police captain Joe Stonetree on the syndicated TV series Forever Knight, and Chief Tom in the CBC first nations TV series The Rez. Farmer is best known for his role as spiritual Native American guide Nobody in Dead Man. Farmer reprised the role for a cameo in Ghost Dog: The Way of the Samurai, also directed by Jim Jarmusch.

Farmer has performed in both the film and television adaptations of Tony Hillerman's novels. He played "Cowboy" Albert Dashee (Hopi) in the 1991 film The Dark Wind, and Captain Largo (Navajo) in the television adaptations of Coyote Waits (2003) and A Thief of Time (2004).

He played a supporting character Burt in the 2001 crime thriller The Score starring Robert De Niro, Marlon Brando, Ed Norton, Angela Bassett and Paul Soles. Farmer also appeared in two episodes of the popular children's television show Big Comfy Couch as Wobbly.

He was nominated for Independent Spirit Awards for his roles in the movies Powwow Highway, Dead Man, and Smoke Signals. Farmer also played the role of Fagin in Twist, the 2003 independent adaptation of the Charles Dickens classic novel Oliver Twist, played the role of "Iktome" in the 2003 all Native American cast TV film Dreamkeeper, directed by Steve Barron. He also played Deputy Bob in Demon Knight. Two of his latest major roles were Henry Colville, with Kris Kristofferson, in Disappearances (2006) and Jack in Jimmy P: Psychotherapy of a Plains Indian (2013) by Arnaud Desplechin.

He also has a blues band called Gary Farmer and the Troublemakers. The band has released two CDs, Love Songs and Other Issues in 2007 and Lovesick Blues in 2009. He recorded the audiobook version of Louise Erdrich's 2012 novel The Round House, winner of the 2012 National Book Award for Fiction. Farmer appeared in season 1 of the Sundance TV series The Red Road in 2014.

Farmer is also a regular supporter of University of Nebraska Omaha Wambli Sapa Memorial Pow Wow, held a week before the Gathering of Nations Powwow. He makes appearances selling his CD's and occasionally giving speeches. University of Nebraska-Omaha (UNO) considers Farmer a "very good friend".

In 2020, Farmer had brief appearances in the films First Cow and The Dark Divide.

Filmography

Film

Television

References

External links

1953 births
Living people
People from the County of Brant
Cayuga people
Native American actors
Canadian male film actors
Canadian male television actors
Canadian male voice actors
First Nations male actors
Male actors from Ontario
First Nations musicians
Canadian blues singers